Vyacheslav Troshin (born 22 May 1959) is a Russian diver. He competed in the men's 3 metre springboard event at the 1980 Summer Olympics.

References

1959 births
Living people
Russian male divers
Soviet male divers
Olympic divers of the Soviet Union
Divers at the 1980 Summer Olympics
Sportspeople from Saratov